The , also known as ORC 1, is a mixed-use, mainly hotel and office, skyscraper in the Osaka Resort City 200 building complex located in the Minato-ku ward of Osaka, Japan. Completed in March 1993, it stands at 200 m (656 ft) tall, with the top floor located at 188.7 m (619 ft). It is the 5th tallest building in Osaka Prefecture and the 36th tallest building in Japan.

See also 
 List of tallest structures in Osaka Prefecture

References

Office buildings completed in 1993
Skyscrapers in Osaka
Skyscraper office buildings in Japan
Skyscraper hotels in Japan
Hotel buildings completed in 1993